Carabus exiguus ochotonarum is a bronze-coloured subspecies of ground beetle in the subfamily Carabinae that is endemic to Gansu, China.

References

exiguus ochotonarum
Beetles described in 1996
Beetles of Asia
Endemic fauna of Gansu